Greenfield, Nova Scotia may refer to a location in Canada:

Greenfield, Colchester County
Greenfield, Hants County
Greenfield, Kings County
Greenfield, Queens County

See also
 Greenfield (disambiguation)